Stylopoda is a genus of moths of the family Noctuidae.

Species
 Stylopoda anxia J.B. Smith, 1908
 Stylopoda cephalica J.B. Smith, 1891
 Stylopoda groteana (Dyar, 1903)
 Stylopoda modestella (Barnes & McDunnough, 1918)

Former species
 Stylopoda aterrima is now Sympistis aterrima (Grote, 1879)
 Stylopoda sexpunctata is now Copanarta sexpunctata (Barnes & McDunnough, 1916)

References
Natural History Museum Lepidoptera genus database
Stylopoda at funet

Cuculliinae